Rain Man is a 1988 American road comedy-drama film.

Rain Man may also refer to:
 "Rain Man" (Eminem song)
 Rainman (wrestler), a ring name of professional wrestler Kory Chavis